Tahl Leibovitz (born June 1, 1975) is an American para table tennis player who has played in five Paralympic Games. His highest ranking is world no.2 in class 9 in July 2008 and is now currently ranked world no.3 in that class and world no.17 in men's standing classes.

Biography
Leibovitz was born in New York City to parents who struggled with substance abuse and mental illness. He was kicked out of his home and lived on the streets. 

He graduated in New York University and now works in New York City as a social worker.

Sporting career
He first competed in his first Paralympic Games in Atlanta in 1996 where he won his first gold medal. 
He hopes to qualify for his sixth Paralympic Games in Tokyo in 2020.

References

1975 births
Sportspeople from Queens, New York
Medalists at the 1996 Summer Paralympics
Medalists at the 2004 Summer Paralympics
Table tennis players at the 1996 Summer Paralympics
Table tennis players at the 2004 Summer Paralympics
Table tennis players at the 2008 Summer Paralympics
Table tennis players at the 2012 Summer Paralympics
Table tennis players at the 2016 Summer Paralympics
Living people
Paralympic medalists in table tennis
Paralympic gold medalists for the United States
Paralympic bronze medalists for the United States
Paralympic table tennis players of the United States
Medalists at the 2007 Parapan American Games
Medalists at the 2011 Parapan American Games
Medalists at the 2015 Parapan American Games
Medalists at the 2019 Parapan American Games
Table tennis players at the 2020 Summer Paralympics
New York University alumni
American male table tennis players